Giga Teymurazovich Mamulashvili (born 2 October 1991) is a Russian former professional football player of Georgian descent.

External links
 
 
 Career summary by sportbox.ru

1991 births
Footballers from Tbilisi
Russian sportspeople of Georgian descent
Living people
Russian footballers
Association football forwards
FC Tiraspol players
FC Shukura Kobuleti players
Moldovan Super Liga players
Erovnuli Liga players
Russian expatriate footballers
Expatriate footballers in Moldova
Expatriate footballers in Georgia (country)
FC Veles Moscow players